Salt Sulphur Springs Historic District is a national historic district located at Salt Sulphur Springs, near Union, West Virginia, Monroe County, West Virginia.  The district includes seven contributing buildings, three contributing sites, and two contributing structures related to the Old Salt Sulphur Springs Resort or "Old Salt." Notable properties include the Old Stone Hotel, Episcopal Chapel, Stone Store Building (1820), Stone Bath House (1820), Stone Spring House (c. 1820), Sweet Sulphur Springs Site (discovered 1802), Salt Sulphur Spring (discovered 1805), and Iodine Spring (1838). It is the area's most significant collection of native limestone buildings.

It was listed on the National Register of Historic Places in 1985.

Gallery

References

External links

Buildings and structures in Monroe County, West Virginia
Defunct resorts
Destination spas
Greek Revival architecture in West Virginia
Historic American Buildings Survey in West Virginia
Historic districts on the National Register of Historic Places in West Virginia
National Register of Historic Places in Monroe County, West Virginia
Resorts in West Virginia
Historic districts in Monroe County, West Virginia